Heinz Martin Albert Röttger (6 November 1909 – 26 August 1977) was a German composer.

From 1928 to 1931 Röttger attended the Akademie der Tonkunst in Munich, where he studied under Walter Courvoisier and Hugo Röhr. From 1930 to 1934 he studied under Alfred Lorenz and Adolf Sandberger at the University of Munich; his doctoral thesis was on problems of form in the work of Richard Strauss. Until the outbreak of the Second World War he was Kapellmeister in Augsburg, in Bavaria.

After the War he worked at the Stralsunder Theater, in Stralsund in Mecklenburg-Vorpommern; in 1951 he became music director of the Volkstheater Rostock and the municipal orchestra there.

His works include Bellmann, 1946; Phaeton, 1957; Der Heiratsantrag, a comic opera after Anton Chekhov, 1960; Die Frauen von Troja, 1962; Der Weg nach Palermo, 1965; Spanisches Capriccio, 1976.

References

Further reading 
 Hollfelder, Peter: Die Klaviermusik, Hamburg 1999
 Laux, Karl (editor): Das Musikleben in der Deutschen Demokratischen Republik, Leipzig o.–J.
 Rosenfeld, Gerhard: Begleittext zur CD Hastedt HT 5314 zeitgenossen ost 14: Heinz Röttger: Orchesterwerke

1909 births
1977 deaths
People from Herford
20th-century German composers
German conductors (music)
Handel Prize winners